Jomei Bean-Lindo (born 9 May 1998) is a Bermudian international footballer who plays for Dandy Town Hornets, as a left back.

Career
Bean-Lindo is currently playing football for Dandy Town Hornets.

He made his international debut for Bermuda in 2020.

References

1998 births
Living people
Bermudian footballers
Bermuda international footballers
Association football defenders
Dandy Town Hornets F.C. players